Bette R. Lasky (born March 16, 1947) was a member of the New Hampshire Senate, representing the 13th District from 2008 to 2010, and again from 2012 until her retirement in 2018. During her tenure, Lasky represented Wards 3, 4, 6, 7, 8, and 9 in Nashua, New Hampshire. While on the State Senate she has served as Chair of the Election Law and Veteran's affairs Committee. Lasky has also served as Vice-Chair of the Judiciary Committee, and as a member of the Education Committee, and the Energy, Environment, and Economic Development Committee.

Prior to becoming a State Senator, Lasky served in the New Hampshire House of Representatives for five terms, and served as Assistant Majority Leader during the 2007-2008 biennium. Prior to that, Lasky served as the House Minority Whip. Lasky has also served as Chair of the Nashua Planning Board, as a Nashua City Councilwoman, and as Vice Chairman of the Nashua City Committee.

Lasky holds a degree in Political Science from the University of Massachusetts Amherst, and currently lives in Nashua with her husband Dr. Elliot Lasky. They have two grown daughters. Lasky has been active in the community for many years, and has held several volunteer positions. Lasky has served on the Board of Directors for Girls, Inc., as well as for the Disability Rights Center.

References

External links
The New Hampshire House of Representatives - Bette Lasky official NH government website
Project Vote Smart - Representative Bette R. Lasky (NH) profile
Follow the Money - Bette R Lasky
2006 2004 2002 2000 1998 campaign contributions
Nashua Democrats
Trying to Heal a Rift in New Hampshire Alec MacGillis, The Washington Post, January 18, 2008
2008 Lasky re-election website

Democratic Party members of the New Hampshire House of Representatives
Living people
1947 births
Women state legislators in New Hampshire
21st-century American politicians
21st-century American women politicians